Henric is a given name. Notable people with the name include:

Carl-Henric Svanberg (born 1952), Swedish businessman, chairman of Volvo and CEO of telecommunications company Ericsson
Fredrik Henric af Chapman (1721–1808), Swedish shipbuilder, scientist and officer in the Swedish navy
Hans Henric von Essen (1755–1824), Swedish officer and statesman
Henric Benzelius (1689–1758), Bishop of Lund, Archbishop of Uppsala in the Church of Sweden
Henric Cihoski (born 1871), Romanian Lieutenant-General during World War II
Henric de la Cour (born 1974), Swedish songwriter, musician and singer
Henric Hedlund (born 1945), retired Swedish professional ice hockey player
Henric Hirsch (1923–1999), Romanian theatre and television director
Henric Holmberg (born 1946), Swedish actor, director and scriptwriter
Henric Horn af Åminne (1880–1947), Swedish horse rider
Henric Petri or Henricus Petrus or Sebastian Henric Petri, names used for publications from a 16th-century printer shop of Basel
Henric Schartau (1757–1825), Swedish Lutheran pietistic clergyman
Henric Trenk (1818–1892), Swiss-born Romanian painter and graphic artist
Henric van Veldeke (born before or c. 1150 – died after 1184), writer
Johan Henric Kellgren (1751–1795), Swedish poet and critic
Laurent Henric, former French footballer and coach, born 20 March 1905 in Sète (Hérault), died 1992

See also
Heinrich (disambiguation)
Heinrichs
Henrich
Henrik
Henrique (disambiguation)
Henriques (disambiguation)